Charles Berger may refer to:

Heinie Berger (Charles Carl Berger, 1882–1954), Major League Baseball player
Charles Berger (academic) (died 2018), Professor of Communication at University of California, Davis
Charles Berger (wrestler), retired Canadian professional wrestler
Charles M. Berger (1936–2008), former Heinz executive
Charles W. Berger (born 1936), American politician